Anaïs Mitchell is the eighth studio album by American singer-songwriter Anaïs Mitchell, released on January 28, 2022, through BMG Rights Management, her first release on the label. It is her first studio album following her Tony Award-winning musical Hadestown. The album features musical contributions from Michael Lewis, JT Bates, Thomas Bartlett, Aaron Dessner and Nico Muhly.

Promotion
"Bright Star" was released as the album's first single on October 28, 2021. It is an indie folk song "about looking back on years of restless pursuit and making peace with the source of that longing: the Muse, the Great Unknown, the One That Got Away – those things that motivate us that we never can touch." It impacted adult alternative radio on January 10, 2022.

Album opener "Brooklyn Bridge" was released as the second single from the album on December 2, 2021. Of the song, Mitchell said "Having left New York, I was able to write a love letter to it in a way I never could when I was living there. It was like, fuck it. This is how I feel. There is nothing more beautiful than riding over one of the New York bridges at night next to someone who inspires you."

"On Your Way (Felix Song)" was released as the third single on January 12, 2022. Dedicated to the late Felix McTeigue, Mitchell said of him "We briefly had the same manager in our early 'hustling days' of trying to get a songwriter career going. I can picture us playing at the old Living Room on the lower east side, and me being one of five people in Felix’s audience, and vice versa. Felix was really fearless and present, he always had a guitar on his back, he was always writing something, he loved the act of just rushing headlong into writing, recording, not overthinking it. It's a lesson I'll return to for the rest of my life."

Mitchell will tour the album across the United States and Europe in 2022, with her band Bonny Light Horseman joining her for some American dates.

Track listing

Personnel
Musicians
 Anaïs Mitchell – vocals (all tracks), acoustic guitar (2–4, 7–9)
 Michael Lewis – bass (1, 2, 4–8, 10), saxophone (1, 2, 4, 6, 10), tenor saxophone (3), clarinet (6), synthesizer (10)
 JT Bates – drums, percussion (1–8, 10)
 Josh Kaufman – electric guitar (1–8), synthesizer (1, 10), bass (3), piano (3, 9), mandolin (4, 6) organ (6, 10), harmonica (8), 12-string guitar (10), synth bass (10)
 Aaron Dessner – electric guitar (1, 2, 4, 10)
 Nico Muhly – ensemble, string arrangement (1); arrangement (6, 9, 10)
 Thomas Bartlett – piano (1, 2, 4–8, 10), synthesizer (1–4, 9, 10), Wurlitzer (2, 3, 8, 9), Rhodes piano (4), Mellotron (6), organ (7)
 Nadia Sirota – viola (1, 9, 10)
 Nathan Schram – violin (1, 9, 10)
 Alex Sopp – flute (6)

Technical
 Josh Kaufman – production
 Greg Calbi – mastering 
 Steve Fallone – mastering
 D. James Goodwin – mixing
 Bella Blasko – engineering

Charts

References

2022 albums
Anaïs Mitchell albums
BMG Rights Management albums
Folk baroque albums